Fernandy Mendy (born 16 January 1994) is a professional footballer who plays as a defender. Born in Senegal, he represents Guinea-Bissau internationally.

Mendy started his senior career at Angers SCO II before joining La Flèche in 2014. In summer 2019, he joined Scottish side Raith Rovers following a trial spell at the club, before joining Kelty Hearts on loan in September of that year. He left Raith in summer 2021 after the end of contract , having made 18 appearances and 1 goal for the club, and signed for Alloa Athletic.

Early life
Mendy was born in Guédiawaye, Senegal, as the oldest of 7 children. He and his family moved to Saint-Nazaire at the age of nine.

Club career
After playing youth and senior football for Saint Nazaire, and senior football for Angers SCO II and La Flèche, he signed for Raith Rovers in summer 2019 following a trial period at the club. He made his debut for the club on 13 July 2019 in a 3–0 Scottish League Cup defeat to Dundee, where he gave possession away for the first goal and conceded a penalty for the second. He joined Kelty Hearts on a short-term loan in September 2019. He played for Raith Rovers in a 3–1 Scottish League Cup defeat to Heart of Midlothian on 13 October 2020. He was released by the club in summer 2021.

In July 2021, Mendy signed for Scottish League One side Alloa Athletic. On 7 March 2022, Mendy was released from his contract with Alloa Athletic.

International career
Mendy was born in Senegal and is of Bissau-Guinean descent, and moved to France at a young age. He received his first international call-up to the Guinea-Bissau national team in March 2021. He was called up to the Guinea-Bissau squad for the 2021 Africa Cup of Nations.

References

External links

1994 births
Living people
People from Dakar Region
Citizens of Guinea-Bissau through descent
Bissau-Guinean footballers
Senegalese footballers
Senegalese people of Bissau-Guinean descent
Association football defenders
Senegalese emigrants to France
Raith Rovers F.C. players
Kelty Hearts F.C. players
Alloa Athletic F.C. players
Championnat National 3 players
Scottish Professional Football League players
Bissau-Guinean expatriate footballers
Senegalese expatriate footballers
Bissau-Guinean expatriate sportspeople in Scotland
Senegalese expatriate sportspeople in Scotland
Expatriate footballers in Scotland